Vedlozero is an old Karelian village in Russia, the administrative center of the Vedlozero rural settlement of the Pryazhinsky District of the Republic of Karelia.

General information 

Located on the northeastern shore of Lake Vedlozero, at the confluence of the Vohta River, 50 km from the regional center.

A pedigree farm, forestry, a secondary school, a kindergarten, a feldsher point, a cultural center, and a library are working.

The Karelian Vieljärvi choir organized in 1938 by I. Levkin is operating.

In 2013, the Karelian Language House was organized in the village.

History 

The village was first mentioned in a document in the 16th century. The Vedlozero graveyard was part of the Obonezhskaya Pyatina of the Novgorod feudal republic.

Population 

The population in 1989 was 1,445.

References

Notes

Sources

Urban-type settlements in the Republic of Karelia
Pryazhinsky District